Jarbas Vasconcelos (born August 23, 1942) is a Brazilian politician and lawyer. He represented Pernambuco in the Federal Senate from 2007 to 2015. Previously, he was governor of Pernambuco from 1999 to 2006. He is a member of the Brazilian Democratic Movement Party.

Early life
Vasconcelos was born in Vicência on August 23, 1942, to Carlindo de Moraes Vasconcelos and Aurea de Andrade Vasconcelos. Along with his eight siblings, his family moved to Recife when he was seven.

Education
After serving in the army for two years, Vasconcelos enrolled into the Catholic University of Pernambuco in 1964. he became interested in politics and joined the Brazilian Democratic Movement in 1966. He finished his Bachelor of Law degree two years later.

Political career

See also
 List of mayors of Recife

References

Living people
1942 births
Members of the Federal Senate (Brazil)
Brazilian Democratic Movement politicians
Governors of Pernambuco
Mayors of Recife
Members of the Legislative Assembly of Pernambuco